The 2016-17 Welsh Football League Division Two will see the following 16 teams participating:

 AFC Llwydcoed
 AFC Porth
 Aberbargoed Buds  (relegated from Welsh Football League Division One)
 Aberdare Town (relegated from Welsh Football League Division One)
 Abergavenny Town (promoted from Welsh Football League Division Three)
 Ammanford
 Briton Ferry Llansawel (demoted from Welsh Football League Division One)
 Croesyceiliog
 Cwmamman United
 Dinas Powys
 Garden Village  (relegated from Welsh Football League Division One)
 Llanelli Town  
 Newport City (renamed from Llanwern FC)
 Pontardawe Town
 Pontypridd Town (promoted from Welsh Football League Division Three)
 West End

External links
 http://wfleague.co.uk/table#content

Welsh Football League Division Two seasons